The 1986–87 BCAFL was the 2nd full season of the British Collegiate American Football League, organised by the British Students American Football Association.

Division changes
With the increase in numbers, the single Division was replaced with two Conferences (Scottish & Northern), along with end-of-season playoffs.

Team changes
After the completion of the first season, the League returned with all four of the previous season's teams joined by four new entries from:
 University of Glasgow, playing as the Tigers
 University of Leicester, playing as the Lemmings
 University of Stirling, playing as the Clansmen
 University of Strathclyde, playing as the Hawks

Regular season

Scottish Conference

Note - All Glasgow's matches were awarded.

Northern Conference

Playoffs

Note - the table does not indicate who played home or away in each fixture.

References

External links
 Official BUAFL Website
 Official BAFA Website

1986-87
1987 in British sport
1986 in British sport
1987 in American football
1986 in American football